Lindal Rohde (born 21 September 1990) is an Australian rules footballer who played for the Fremantle Football Club in the AFL Women's (AFLW).

A former netballer, Rohde was recruited as a rookie selection ahead of the 2019 AFL Women's draft. Her debut season for Subiaco in the WAFL Women's league was very successful, winning the Cath Boyce Rookie of the Year award. As a netballer she won the Jill McIntosh Medal in 2016 as the best player in the West Australian Netball League. Rohde has also played netball for both West Coast Fever and Western Sting. In August 2020, she was delisted by Fremantle.

References

External links 

Living people
1990 births
Fremantle Football Club (AFLW) players
Australian rules footballers from Western Australia
Australian netball players
Netball players from Western Australia
West Coast Fever players
Western Sting players
Australian Netball League players
West Australian Netball League players